Meganeflus fallax is a species of beetle in the family Cerambycidae, the only species in the genus Meganeflus.

References

Elaphidiini